This glossary of American politics is a list of definitions of terms and phrases used in politics in the United States. The list includes terms specific to U.S. political systems (at both national and sub-national levels), as well as concepts and ideologies that occur in other political systems but which nonetheless are frequently encountered in American politics.

A

B

C

D

E

F

G

H

I

J

K

L

M

N

O

P

Q

R

S

T

U

V

W

Y

See also
 Glossary of policy debate terms

References

Political terminology of the United States
American politics
Wikipedia glossaries using description lists